Davide Marsura (born 20 February 1994) is an Italian professional footballer who plays as a winger for  club Ascoli.

Club career
On 16 January 2019, he signed with Carpi until the end of the 2018–19 season, with an option for another year.

On 1 July 2019, Marsura signed to Livorno.

On 15 January 2021, Marsura signed with Serie B club Pisa.

On 2 September 2022, Marsura returned to Modena on a one-year deal. On 31 January 2023, he moved to Ascoli.

References

External links
Goal

1994 births
People from Valdobbiadene
Sportspeople from the Province of Treviso
Footballers from Veneto
Living people
Italian footballers
Italy youth international footballers
Udinese Calcio players
FeralpiSalò players
Modena F.C. players
Brescia Calcio players
Venezia F.C. players
A.C. Carpi players
U.S. Livorno 1915 players
Pisa S.C. players
Modena F.C. 2018 players
Ascoli Calcio 1898 F.C. players
Serie B players
Serie C players
Association football wingers